Jesús Olmo Lozano (born 24 January 1985) is a Spanish professional footballer who plays as a central defender.

Club career
Born in Barcelona, Catalonia, Olmo emerged through FC Barcelona's prolific youth ranks at La Masia, and first represented professionally their reserves. On 20 May 2006 he made his debut for the first team, playing the full 90 minutes in a 1–3 away loss against Athletic Bilbao as a number of the main squad's players were already resting for the 2006 FIFA World Cup and Barça were already league champions.

Olmo took part in five games for the senior team during the 2006–07 pre-season, and later added a second La Liga appearance, one minute at Getafe CF (1–1 draw). After a loan in the second division with lowly Racing de Ferrol, he was released by Barcelona and joined another club in that tier, Elche CF.

After a one-year stint at Segunda División B's CD Puertollano, Olmo returned to the second division after agreeing to a contract with CE Sabadell FC. In 2014 he joined CF Reus Deportiu one level below, helping in their first-ever promotion to the second tier in 2016.

An ever-present figure for the Rojinegres, Olmo left the club in January 2019 after its ejection from the Liga de Fútbol Profesional. Late in that month, he returned to Elche on a short-term deal.

On 14 August 2019, Olmo became a free agent and returned to Sabadell, with the club now in the third tier. He spent the entire campaign nursing a serious knee injury, contributing only one appearance to his side's promotion.

Olmo terminated his contract on 9 January 2021.

References

External links
 

1985 births
Living people
Footballers from Barcelona
Spanish footballers
Association football defenders
La Liga players
Segunda División players
Segunda División B players
Tercera División players
FC Barcelona C players
FC Barcelona Atlètic players
FC Barcelona players
Racing de Ferrol footballers
Elche CF players
CD Puertollano footballers
CE Sabadell FC footballers
CF Reus Deportiu players
Spain youth international footballers